Park Sang-hee (born 17 October 1995) is an inactive South Korean female tennis player.

Park has a career high WTA singles ranking of 619, achieved on 22 May 2017. She also has a career high WTA doubles ranking of 540 achieved on 19 June 2017. Park has won two ITF Circuit doubles titles in her career.

Park made her WTA Tour main-draw debut at the 2017 Korea Open, where she received a wildcard alongside Jeong Su-nam in the doubles draw.

ITF Circuit finals

Singles: 1 (runner-up)

Doubles: 6 (2 titles, 4 runner-ups)

External links
 
 

1995 births
Living people
South Korean female tennis players
21st-century South Korean women